Derrick Lewis is an American MMA fighter. Derrick Lewis may also refer to:
Derrick Lewis (American football) (born 1975), American football player
Derrick Lewis (basketball) (born 1966), American basketball player

See also
Derek Lewis (footballer) (1929–1953), English footballer
Derek Lewis (prison governor) (born 1946), British official